Alexander T. Gray, also called Alex T. Grey, was a politician from the U.S. state of Wisconsin.  He served as that state's fourth Secretary of State for a single term from January 2, 1854, to January 7, 1856.  He was a Democrat and served under Democratic governor William A. Barstow.

He resided in Janesville, Wisconsin, at the time of his election.

References 

Secretaries of State of Wisconsin
Wisconsin Democrats
Year of birth missing
Year of death missing